Bring Him In is a 1921 American silent drama film directed by Robert Ensminger and Earle Williams and starring Williams, Fritzi Ridgeway and Ernest Van Pelt.

Cast
 Earle Williams as 	Dr. John Hood
 Fritzi Ridgeway as Mary Mackay
 Elmer Dewey as Baptiste
 Ernest Van Pelt as Canby
 Paul Weigel as Braganza
 Bruce Gordon as McKenna

References

Bibliography
 Connelly, Robert B. The Silents: Silent Feature Films, 1910-36, Volume 40, Issue 2. December Press, 1998.
 Munden, Kenneth White. The American Film Institute Catalog of Motion Pictures Produced in the United States, Part 1. University of California Press, 1997.

External links
 

1921 films
1921 drama films
1920s English-language films
American silent feature films
Silent American drama films
American black-and-white films
Vitagraph Studios films
1920s American films